Alicia is a genus in the Malpighiaceae, a family of about 75 genera of flowering plants in the order Malpighiales. Alicia comprises 2 species of woody vines widespread in South America.

It is named after the Argentine-French botanist Alicia Lourteig.

External links and references

Malpighiaceae Malpighiaceae - description, taxonomy, phylogeny, and nomenclature
Alicia
Anderson, W. R. 2006. Eight segregates from the neotropical genus Mascagnia (Malpighiaceae). Novon 16: 168–204.

Malpighiaceae
Malpighiaceae genera